Kitchener-Waterloo Dutchmen could mean the following:

 Kitchener-Waterloo Dutchmen (football), a member of the Ontario Rugby Football Union
 Kitchener-Waterloo Dutchmen (ice hockey), a senior ice hockey team that represented Canada in the 1956 and 1960 Winter Olympics
 Kitchener-Waterloo Dutchmen, an Intercounty Baseball League team now known as the Kitchener Panthers

See also
 Kitchener Dutchmen

Sport in Kitchener, Ontario